Pedro Roig (22 December 1938 – 22 November 2018) was a Spanish field hockey player who competed in the 1960 Summer Olympics. He was born in Terrassa.

References

External links
 

1938 births
2018 deaths
Spanish male field hockey players
Olympic field hockey players of Spain
Field hockey players at the 1960 Summer Olympics
Olympic bronze medalists for Spain
Olympic medalists in field hockey
Field hockey players from Catalonia
Medalists at the 1960 Summer Olympics
Sportspeople from Terrassa
20th-century Spanish people